Richlands High School may refer to:

Richlands High School (North Carolina)
Richlands High School (Richlands, Virginia)